The Mecklenburg T 3 was a German, goods train, tank locomotive built for the Grand Duchy of Mecklenburg Friedrich-Franz Railway (Großherzoglich Mecklenburgische Friedrich-Franz-Eisenbahn) from 1884. Originally designated as the Class XVII it had an 0-6-0T wheel arrangement and was based on the Prussian T 3.

These engines were later taken over by the Deutsche Reichsbahn as DRG Class 89.80 and incorporated into their renumbering plan.

A total of 68 examples of this locomotive were produced by various manufacturers between 1884 and 1906. Of these, 51 (the so-called T 3a) corresponded to the older version of the Prussian T 3 with a regulator on top. The other 17 (the T 3b) conformed to the more powerful version with a steam dome. Two of the latter locomotives were given a Walschaerts valve gear instead of the usual Allan valve gear. They were employed primarily on branch line and shunting duties. The last locomotive was retired by the Deutsche Reichsbahn in East Germany in 1963.

See also
Grand Duchy of Mecklenburg Friedrich-Franz Railway
List of Mecklenburg locomotives
Länderbahnen

References 

 
 
 

0-6-0T locomotives
T03
Railway locomotives introduced in 1884
C n2t locomotives
Freight locomotives